Noord Deurningen is a village in the Dutch province of Overijssel. It is a part of the municipality of Dinkelland, and lies about 11 km northeast of Oldenzaal.

Overview 
It was first mentioned between 1337 and 1339 as Nortdorningen, and means the north of Deurningen.

In the 17th century the havezate Noorddeurningen was built near the village. In 1875, Franciscan nuns from Thuine in Germany established an orphanage in the estate, and renamed the estate St.-Nicolaasgesticht. In 1840, Noord Deuningen was home to 722 people.

Gallery

References

Populated places in Overijssel
Dinkelland